Candice McClure (born 22 March 1980), known professionally as Kandyse McClure, is a South African-Canadian actress. She gained prominence through her roles in the Fox Family series Higher Ground (2000), the NBC and Syfy adaptations of Stephen King's Carrie (2002) and Children of the Corn (2009), and as Anastasia Dualla in Battlestar Galactica (2004–2009), also on Syfy. She led the film Sew the Winter to My Skin (2018).

McClure was in the main casts of Persons Unknown (2010) and Ghost Wars (2018), also on NBC and Syfy. She had a recurring role as Dr. Clementine Chasseur in the Netflix series Hemlock Grove (2013).

Early life
Candice McClure was born in the Greenwood Park area of North Durban, South Africa. Her mother is an educator and her father is a musician. She is coloured. From the age of four, McClure moved back and forth between South Africa and Canada. She completed her secondary education at West Vancouver Secondary School in 1998. McClure was cast in a production of Athol Fugard's Valley Song at the age of 17.

Career 
McClure's first television appearance was a lead role with Lou Diamond Phillips in the 1999 television film In a Class of His Own that was followed by the Fox Family teen drama Higher Ground and the NBC Saturday-morning series Just Deal, both of which premiered in 2000. The year 2000 was also the time period when McClure played a recurring role in the Canadian drama television series Da Vinci’s Inquest.

In 2002, McClure portrayed the recurring role of Elizabeth Munroe on Showtime's Jeremiah. Also in that year, the actress played the role of Sue Snell in the television film remake of Stephen King's novel Carrie. Also in 2002, McClure guest starred as Annie Fisher in two episodes of James Cameron's science fiction drama television series Dark Angel on Fox.

From 2003 to 2009, McClure played the role as Anastasia "Dee" Dualla on the Sci Fi Channel series Battlestar Galactica. McClure's character, a Petty Officer Second Class in the Colonial Fleet, has never appeared in the original 1978 series, but was initially an analogue of Sarah Rush's original series character Flight Corporal Rigel. McClure was a regular cast member of the series until January 2009.

McClure then appeared in a 2009 television adaptation of King's Children of the Corn and the Carl Bessai feature film from the same year Cole. In 2010 the television series Persons Unknown, in which McClure co-starred, premiered, but the series was not renewed for a second season after it was initially picked up by NBC.

In 2011 McClure played the girlfriend of Stuart Davis in the independent short film Just Be Yourself, a comedy about a desperate man who is offered a job to "just be himself." McClure then joined Davis again in 2011 to co-host the second season of the late-night HDNet program Sex, God, Rock 'n' Roll. In 2012 McClure joined the cast of Netflix original series Hemlock Grove (premiered in January 2013) and completed the feature film Broken Kingdom (alongside Rachael Leigh Cook). McClure has also appeared in other television programs, such as Whistler, Andromeda, Jake 2.0, Smallville, and Reaper.

On 2 February 2016, Historica Canada featured Viola Desmond in the 82nd Heritage Minute, to mark the beginning of Black History Month. The video was filmed on location in High River, Alberta in June 2015. It features Kandyse McClure as Viola Desmond, a civil rights activist and entrepreneur who challenged segregation in Nova Scotia in the 1940s.

Personal life
As of 2013, McClure continues to work with the non-profit organization CARE Canada to address poverty in the world's developing regions. , McClure resides in Vancouver, British Columbia.

McClure is married to musician Ian Cylenz Lee. He proposed to her when they were visiting her family in South Africa in December 2012.

Filmography

Film

Television

Awards and nominations 
 Leo Awards, Nomination Best Supporting Actress, 2002, Carrie
 Peabody Awards, Peabody Award for Excellence in Television, 2005, Battlestar Galactica R&D TV in Association with NBC Universal Television Studio, Sci Fi Channel

References

External links 

 Official site
 

1980 births
Living people
21st-century Canadian actresses
21st-century South African actresses
Actors from Durban
Black Canadian actresses
Canadian film actresses
Canadian television actresses
Canadian voice actresses
Cape Coloureds
South African emigrants to Canada
South African film actresses
South African television actresses
South African voice actresses